An anti-LKM antibody (anti–liver-kidney microsomal antibody or LKM antibody) is any of several autoantibodies that are detected in the serum of patients with different types of acute or chronic liver disease. These antibodies are targeted against antigens of the cytochrome P450 system.

Classification
There are three kinds of anti-LKM antibodies:

References

External links
Recombinant Antibody

Antibodies